A krai is a type of federal subject of the Russian Federation. The country is divided into 89 federal subjects, of which nine are krais. Oblasts, another type of federal subject, are legally identical to krais and the difference between a political entity with the name "krai" or "oblast" is purely traditional, similar to the commonwealths in the United States; both are constituent entities equivalent in legal status in Russia with representation in the Federation Council. During the Soviet era, the autonomous oblasts could be subordinated to republics or krais, but not to oblasts. Outside of political terminology, both words have a very similar general meaning ("region" or "area" in English) and can often be used interchangeably. When a distinction is desirable, "krai" is sometimes translated into English as "territory", while "oblast" can variously be translated to "province" or "region", but both of these translations are also reasonable interpretations of "krai".

Overview
Each krai features a state government holding authority over a defined geographic territory, with a state legislature, the Legislative Assembly, that is democratically elected. The Governor is the highest executive position of the state government in a Krai, and is elected by people. Krais can be divided into raions (districts), cities/towns of krai significance, and okrugs. Krais previously featured autonomous okrugs until the formation of Zabaykalsky Krai on March 1, 2008, when the last remaining autonomous okrug of a krai was abolished.

The term krai or kray is derived from the Russian word for an edge, and can be translated into English as 'frontier' or 'territory'. The most populous krai is Krasnodar Krai at 5,404,300 (2010 Census) and the least populous is Kamchatka Krai at 322,079 (2010).

Historically, krais were massive first-level administrative divisions in the Russian Empire, divided into large  (governorates). Following the numerous administration reforms during the Soviet era, the guberniyas were abolished and krais were reshaped into smaller, more numerous divisions. Eventually, krais and oblasts became almost totally equal as the top-level administrative division of the Soviet Socialist Republics (SSRs), the constituent political entities of the Soviet Union, with the only difference being autonomous oblasts could be subordinated to krais but not to oblasts. The krais were unique to the Russian SFSR, and held very little autonomy or power, but when the Soviet Union dissolved into sovereign states along the lines of the SSRs, they became first-level administrative divisions of the Russian Federation and received much greater devolved power.

List
Below is a list of the krais of Russia, listed in alphabetical order:
 Altai Krai
 Kamchatka Krai
 Khabarovsk Krai
 Krasnodar Krai
 Krasnoyarsk Krai
 Perm Krai
 Primorsky Krai
 Stavropol Krai
 Zabaykalsky Krai

See also
Krais of the Russian Empire
Krajina

References

 
Federal subjects of Russia